Distorted Reality is a synthpop band from Germany / United States.

Band history 

Distorted Reality is the synthpop band formed in 1997 by a collaboration between Martha M. Arce from Miami, United States and Christian Kobusch from Bielefeld, Germany.

Distorted Reality's debut album, The Fine Line Between Love and Hate, was released on 17 May 2002, on Accession Records. The band produced the album along with Bruno Kramm from Das Ich. It also contains re-mixes by Propaganda, Sabotage QCQC and Noyce.

Distorted Reality has also signed with American label Nilaihah Records. The Fine Line Between Love and Hate was released in the US and Canada 13 May 2003. This version contains additional remixes by Assemblage 23, Forma Tadre, Cut.Rate.Box and Null Device.

In 2003 and 2005 Distorted Reality performed live gigs at the Wave-Gotik-Treffen in Leipzig, Germany. In October 2005 Distorted Reality played at the Electronic Pleasures 3 Festival in Berlin, Germany. Further live gigs are planned.

From 2004 to 2006 Martha and Christian worked on their current album ‘Daydreams and Nightmares’, together with the producer Andreas Meyer (Forma Tadre). Remixes from Haujobb, Dust of Basement and In Strict Confidence are included.

Discography
Daydreams and Nightmares (2006; US/Canada release, Nilaihah Records)

 Never Change
 Get a Clue
 Forever
 I Am Waiting
 Those Eyes
 Tag FÜr Tag
 Will You Love Me?
 Something Wicked
 Into the Night
 Rebel Yell
 Something Wicked (In Strict Confidence Remix)
 Never Change
 Something Wicked
 Never Change (Dust Of Basement remix)
 Will You Love Me? (Sea Of Love Remix By Das Ich)
 Rebel Yell (Live Mix)

Daydreams and Nightmares (2006; EU release, Dark Dimsn (Soulfood Music))
The fine Line between Love and Hate (2002; EU release, Accession Records)

 Super Crush
 In my Dream
 Fever
 Haunted
 Your only Jewel
 You want me, you hate me
 Hate Factor
 Sleeper Awaken
 Fear
 Drop
 Fieber
 In my Dream (The Context Mix) – remix by Propaganda
 Fear – remix by Sabotage qcqc
 Dance Factor – remix by Noyce

The Fine Line between Love and Hate (2003; US/Canada release, Nilaihah Records)

 Super Crush
 Fever
 You Want Me, You Hate Me [split] – remix by Assemblage 23
 In My Dream
 Dance Factor – remix by Noyce
 Drop
 Haunted
 You Want Me, You Hate Me
 In my Dream (The Context Mix) – remix by Propaganda
 Super Crush (clip) – remix by cut.rate.box
 Fever (Analog Mix) – remix by Forma Tadre
 Your Only Jewel
 Hate Factor
 Fear – remix by Sabotage qcqc
 Super Crush (ND Sodium Mix) – remix by Null Device

Honors 

 2002: 4th place ‘Newcomer of the year 2002’ at  Grenzwellen.de

External links
Official Site

American electronic music groups
German electronic music groups